The Green Party of Pennsylvania is the Pennsylvania state party affiliate of the Green Party of the United States. Since 2016, the party is again recognized as a minor political party under Pennsylvania law due to receiving the required voter turnout in the 2016 election.

As of early 2018, the party has at least 19 members elected to office statewide.

Party platform and ideology

The Green Party of Pennsylvania supports the Ten Key Values of the Green Party of the United States.

The party platform includes: creation of a single payer universal healthcare system, establishment of a living wage, decriminalization of cannabis, a ban on fracking and nuclear energy, investment in sustainable energy such as solar and wind, and improvements to the state election system.

Party structure

The Green Party of Pennsylvania's highest body is the State Committee, made up of delegates from county affiliate parties, and is governed by internal bylaws. In keeping with the Green Party's key value of "decentralization", county affiliates may draft their own bylaws and procedures, including how to nominate and elect delegates to the State Committee. The party also elects a chair, secretary, and treasurer.

In addition to the governing State Committee, the party operates a number of teams for critical functions, including: the Core Committee (formerly Operations), Communications, Finance, and Green Wave.

The Green Party of Pennsylvania nominates electoral candidates by caucus instead of primary elections.

As of early 2018, 24 county chapters are recognized by the state party, the largest of which are the Green Party of Philadelphia, and the Green Party of Allegheny County (Pittsburgh region).

Current elected officials 
At least 19 persons affiliated with the party have been elected to office in the state of Pennsylvania.

History

Presidential elections 
Since 1996, the national Green Party has run a candidate for president of the United States. In 2000, the Green Party of Pennsylvania placed Ralph Nader, the nominee of the Green Party of the United States, on the statewide presidential ballot. The highest vote total came in 2000, when Nader received over 103,000 votes. The lowest vote total came in 2008, when Cynthia McKinney was the nominee. Her campaign received only 71 votes. Nader, who was also on the ballot as an independent candidate, received more than 42,000 votes.

2006 United States Senate election
In 2006 the Green Party attempted to run Carl Romanelli for the 2006 United States Senate election in Pennsylvania. However, Romanelli was removed from the ballot by Judge James R. Kelley due to insufficient valid signatures on his nominating petition.

2014 state and federal elections
In 2014, the party nominated Paul Glover for governor of Pennsylvania.

2016 presidential election and election audit lawsuit
Dr. Jill Stein was again the party's candidate for president in 2016. Following the election, the Stein campaign filed in Pennsylvania court for a recount, citing insecure electronic voting systems and the lack of paper audit trail. The request was later denied by a federal judge.

2017 elections and lawsuit
In 2017, the previous 2012 Green Party vice presidential candidate Cheri Honkala was nominated for Pennsylvania State Representative in District 197 in Philadelphia for the special election to be held in March 2017.

Shortly after the election, Honkala and the Green Party of Pennsylvania filed a federal lawsuit alleging voter intimidation and election fraud during the special election and calling for a new election to be held. In April 2018, one official was sentenced to probation for one year due to election misconduct, with the remaining defendants awaiting trial in early May 2018.

In 2017, Jules Mermelstein was the nominee for the Superior Court of Pennsylvania. He received 106,969 votes in the general election, and 1.4% of the vote in a nine-way race with four candidates elected. A number of other candidates also ran for local positions including mayor, township council, and school board.

2018 state and federal elections
In 2018, Paul Glover was nominated for governor of Pennsylvania once again.

Jocolyn Bowser-Bostick was the party nominee for lieutenant governor of Pennsylvania.

Neal Gale was the party nominee for US Senate.

Brianna Johnston was the party nominee for US Congress in PA-07 (Special Election)

Three other candidates were also endorsed for state office.

2020 state and federal elections and ballot access lawsuit due to COVID-19
In 2020, Timothy Runkle was nominated for state treasurer, Olivia Faison was nominated for auditor general, and Richard L. Weiss, Esq., was nominated for attorney general. Several candidates for state legislative offices were also endorsed.

On May 15, 2020, the party filed suit in the US Court for the Eastern District of Pennsylvania, demanding relief from unconstitutional election laws alleged to be impossible to meet under emergency Coronavirus disease 2019 (COVID-19) measures declared by Governor Tom Wolf.

References

External links

Political parties in Pennsylvania
P
 
State and local socialist parties in the United States